The 2015–16 Sydney FC season was the club's eleventh season since its establishment in 2004. The club participated in the A-League for the eleventh time, the FFA Cup for the second time, as well as the AFC Champions League for the third time.

Preview

Preseason
Sydney FC began the pre-season with a 7–0 win over Earlwood Wanderers. The club then announced the annual Macarthur Rams pre-season clash. The match took place on 30 July 2015, with Sydney FC cruising to a comfortable 5–1 victory. For both games, Sydney FC fielded mainly youth players and trialist's, of which included Matt Simon and Alex Mullen who would later go on to sign for the club. The club announced a third pre-season friendly against a team of Gold Coast Premier League All-stars for mid-August. However, this match would be ultimately be cancelled as the venue did not meet one of the criteria for Football Federation Australia sanctioned friendlies.

Transfers
Rumours throughout the end of the 2014–15 A-League season that Sydney FC had signed Newcastle Jets and Young Socceroo midfielder, Andrew Hoole were confirmed on 30 April 2015. Following the Grand Final loss to Melbourne Victory key members of the team were still weighing up their options for the season. Initially it was thought the services of Golden Boot winner, Marc Janko would be secured but after he left for Europe the day after the grand final to plan his wedding, rumours circled that he would not return. This was confirmed a week later with the club citing the number of games Janko would miss throughout the season as the A-League does not stop during FIFA breaks a factor in the decision. Janko expressed his displeasure of how things were handled through social media site, Twitter. Senegalese cousins Mickaël Tavares and Jacques Faty were quick to re-sign with club, extending their contracts from injury replacement players to full contracts. The club confirmed the signings of Tavares for two years on 21 May 2015 and one year for Faty on 27 May 2015. The club also announced a two-year deal for striker Shane Smeltz on the same day.

Sydney FC had many places to fill during the off-season, after announcing only eighteen retained players on 3 June 2015. Defender Zachary Anderson was reunited with mentor Graham Arnold, signing for the sky blues on 15 July 2015 for one year. This was quickly followed by the announcement of the highly anticipated foreign marquee and visa spots of Filip Hološko and Miloš Ninković. This appeared to spell the end of the 2014–15 Sydney FC Player of the Year Miloš Dimitrijević's time with club. However, with the departure of Nikola Petković to Westerlo there still remained one visa spot available, and on 28 July 2015, Sydney FC announced that he had re-signed for a further two years. With two days remaining before the commencement of the 2015 FFA Cup, Sydney FC announced the services of another former student of Arnold's (during his time with the Central Coast Mariners), when the club signed Matt Simon. The club then lost the services of talented Socceroos midfielder Terry Antonis when he was transferred to Greek powerhouse PAOK on 19 August 2015. On 25 August 2015, Sydney FC became the first club to utilise the "Mature Age Rookie" concept, signing Alex Mullen on a one-year deal. The club also announced the signing of veteran Sydney FC gloveman Ivan Necevski (who returned to club after a stint with New South Wales Premier League outfit Rockdale City Suns) alongside Sydney FC Youth captain, Jacob Tratt.

Season 

Sydney FC began the regular season at home against Melbourne City. The visitors took an early lead in the 16th when debutant Wade Dekker capitalised on a defensive error by Jacques Faty. However, the Sky Blues bounced back in injury time of the first half after a clever ball from Brandon O'Neill allowed skipper Alex Brosque to set up international marquee Filip Hološko with the equaliser. Sydney FC created many chances in the second stanza but City goalkeeper Thomas Sørensen produced world-class saves time and time again to ensure the match would end 1–1.

Sydney FC then travelled to Hunter Stadium to face New South Wales rivals, Newcastle Jets. Newcastle had a goal disallowed in the first half for an offside infringement. With minutes remaining skipper Alex Brosque was denied by the woodwork, and the match looked destined for a draw. However, in the final minute of the game, Brosque came up with superb header from a corner kick. Sydney won the match 1–0. The win signified Sydney FC's unbeaten streak against Newcastle to eight games. The match also involved a sickening collision between Sydney FC striker Shane Smeltz and Newcastle Jets goalkeeper Mark Birighitti which left the shotstopper requiring hospitalisation and major dental surgery.
 
The first Sydney Derby of the year was hosted by Sydney FC at Allianz Stadium. The attendance of 40,539 was the second largest on record for the fixture and everyone in the stadium witnessed another pulsating clash. For the second match in a row, Sydney FC's opponent had a goal disallowed for an offside infringement in the first half and also for the second match in a row, Sydney FC scored in the dying minutes to win 1–0. Serbian international Miloš Ninković latched onto a splendid through-ball from rookie central midfielder Brandon O'Neill to put the game to bed. Sydney FC extended its unbeaten derby streak to five matches.

Sydney FC travelled to Gosford, to play Central Coast Mariners at Central Coast Stadium, on 31 October. Shane Smeltz opened the scoring in the 34th minute after some clever work from Alex Brosque, sweeping it home from close range. Mariners striker Roy O'Donovan then equalised a minute later with an easy tap-in from close range. A few minutes later, O'Donovan was through on goal, and attempted to round Sydney keeper Vedran Janjetovic before being taken down and going to ground. However, the referee did not award a penalty. Three minutes before the interval, Mariners midfielder Nick Fitzgerald was sent off for a second yellow card, swinging the game in Sydney's favour. After a lengthy stalemate, Mariners all-time top goalscorer and new Sydney FC signing Matt Simon scored after a marauding run from Filip Hološko, who unselfishly laid the ball off to Simon. Six minutes later, Simon scored his second goal after a smart run from Mickaël Tavares, and thus, the game ended 3–1, to Sydney. Sydney remained on top of the A-League ladder as the only unbeaten team remaining in the competition.

Players

Squad

From youth squad

Transfers in

Transfers out

Technical staff

Statistics

Squad statistics

|-
|colspan="24"|Players no longer at the club:

Preseason and friendlies

Competitions

Overall

A-League

League table

Results summary

Results by round

Matches

FFA Cup

AFC Champions League

Group stage

Round of 16

End-of-season awards
On 6 May, 2016, Sydney FC hosted their annual Sky Blue Ball and presented eight awards on the night.

References

External links
 Official Website

Sydney FC
Sydney FC seasons